Badehar Urf Dehlan is a village situated in Una Tehsil of Una district, Himachal Pradesh, India. It is one of the largest village in Himachal Pradesh.

Demographics
Badehar Urf Dehlan has a population of 2,487 people out of which 1,221 are males and 1,266 are females according to the 2011 Indian Census.

References

Villages in Una district